The 1969 Rice Owls football team was an American football team that represented Rice University in the Southwest Conference (SWC) during the 1969 NCAA University Division football season. In its third season under head coach Bo Hagan, the team compiled a 3–7 record (2–5 against SWC opponents), tied for sixth place in the conference, and was outscored by a total of 225 to 168. The team played its home games at Rice Stadium in Houston.

The team's statistical leaders included quarterback Stahle Vincent with 556 passing yards, tailback Mike Spruill with 440 rushing yards and 48 points scored, and Bob Brown with 375 receiving yards. Vincent was the first African-American to be the starting quarterback for a Southwest Conference football team.

Schedule

References

Rice
Rice Owls football seasons
Rice Owls football